Ann Fletcher Jackson (27 February 1833 – 15 October 1903) was a New Zealand Quaker evangelist. She was born in Leigh, Lancashire, England, on 27 February 1833.

References

1833 births
1903 deaths
New Zealand Quakers
People from Leigh, Greater Manchester
Quaker evangelicals
English emigrants to New Zealand
19th-century New Zealand people